The tarantella is a traditional dance form, and accompanying music, with a distinctive rhythm, from the south of Italy. Tarantellas appear in many pieces of classical music, in literature, and in popular culture.

Classical music
 Mily Balakirev has a "Tarantella in B major".
 Agustín Barrios wrote a "Tarantella for guitar (Recuerdos de Nápoles)".
 Ludwig van Beethoven's "Kreutzer" Violin Sonata, third movement, is a tarantella.
 Ludwig van Beethoven's Piano Sonata No. 18, fourth movement, is a tarantella.
 Benjamin Britten wrote a tarantella as the third and final movement of his Sinfonietta, Op. 1.
 Mario Castelnuovo-Tedesco wrote a tarantella for solo guitar, Op. 87b.
 Frédéric Chopin wrote a Tarantelle in A-flat, Op. 43 with the characteristic  time signature.  It was inspired specifically by Rossini's's song "La Danza".
 John Corigliano wrote a tarantella as the fourth movement of his Gazebo Dances, which he later used as the basis of the second movement of his Symphony No. 1.
 Claude Debussy wrote a piece called "Danse (Tarantelle styrienne)."
 Leopold Godowsky transcribed Chopin's Étude Op. 10, No. 5 "Black Key" into a tarantella for the piano.
 Grande Tarantelle, Op. 67 for piano and orchestra, written c.1866 by Louis Moreau Gottschalk.
 Oleg Karavaychuk wrote a tarantella.
 Helmut Lachenmann's twelfth movement of Tanzsuite mit Deutschlandlied (1979–80) is a tarantelle.
 Franz Liszt composed a piece called "Tarantella, Venezia e Napoli" (No. 3 from Années de pèlerinage, 2nd Year: Italy), which is in a rapid tempo in – time. Liszt also made solo piano transcriptions and expansive reworkings of tarantellas by several composers including Gioacchino Rossini, Daniel Auber, Alexander Dargomizhsky and César Cui.
 Felix Mendelssohn wrote a piece called "Tarantella" in 1845 (Op. 102, No. 3).
 Felix Mendelssohn's Italian Symphony, forth movement, is a tarantella.
 Santiago de Murcia, a baroque Spanish composer and guitarist, wrote "Tarantelas" for guitar. It is No. 13 of his collection Saldivar Codex IV
 Albert Pieczonka, a pianist and composer who performed in Prussia, England, and the United States wrote a popular piano composition titled "Tarantella in A minor".
 David Popper wrote a piece called "Tarantella, Op. 33", written in  time.
 The fourth of Sergei Prokofiev's twelve easy pieces for piano—Musique d'Enfants, Op. 65—is a tarantella.
 Sergei Rachmaninoff's Suite No. 2 for Two Pianos, Op. 17, features a tarantella for its finale.
 Gioachino Rossini's song "La Danza" is a Neapolitan tarantella.
 Camille Saint-Saëns composed "Tarantella, Op. 6 in A minor for flute, clarinet and orchestra, or for flute, clarinet and piano". He also transcribed this piece for two pianos.
 Gaspar Sanz, a baroque Spanish composer, wrote La Tarantella, Musik Aus Italien for lute (or guitar).
 Pablo de Sarasate composed an Introduction and Tarantella for violin.
 Franz Schubert's Death and the Maiden Quartet uses a tarantella in the frenetic fourth movement.
 Franz Schubert's Piano Sonata in C minor, last movement, is a tarantella/rondo.
 The fourth movement of Schubert's Symphony No. 3 is also a tarantella, but following the sonata form.
 John Serry Sr. composed his Tarantella for solo stradella accordion in 1942 and revised it in 1955.  
 Allan Small wrote "Tarantella in A minor for piano".
 William Henry Squire wrote "Tarantella for cello in D minor".
 The fifteenth section of Igor Stravinsky's Pulcinella is a tarantella.  This music is also the fourth movement of the composer's Pulcinella Suite and fifth of his Suite italienne.
 Karol Szymanowski wrote a Nocturne and Tarantella for violin and piano.
 Pyotr Ilyich Tchaikovsky's Capriccio Italien ends in a frenzied variation of a tarantella. Also, one of his Pas de Deux in The Nutcracker features a tarantella.
 Ferdinand Thieriot included a tarantella in his Symphonietta op. 55 E major (1873/1892), conducted by Arthur Nikisch and the Boston Symphony Orchestra in February 1893.
 Mark-Anthony Turnage composed a violin concerto entitled Mambo, Blues and Tarantella in 2007.
 Fred Werner 1909 Tarantelle 
 Henryk Wieniawski composed a well-known violin piece called Scherzo-Tarantella, Op. 16.
 Tarantella for Piano and Orchestra was composed by American composer Michael Glenn Williams for pianist Sean Chen.
 The last movement of Malcolm Williamson's Sinfonietta (1965) is a tarantella.

Film
 The Fairy Godmother's song "Bibbidi-Bobbidi-Boo" from Disney's Cinderella (1950) is a tarantella in rhythm and tempo.
 The popular wedding tarantella C'è la luna mezzo mare has appeared in feature films such as The Godfather (1972).
 In The Godfather Part II  (1974), Frankie Pentangeli tries to get the band playing at Michael's son's 1st communion party (whose members are not Italian) to play a tarantella; following some quick coaching, the band instead ends up playing "Pop Goes the Weasel".
 It appears in The Legend of 1900 (1998) when Italian immigrants request 1900 to play tarantella music.
 The tarantella dance is referenced in the film Harry Potter and the Chamber of Secrets (2002), where it is the result of a magical curse.
 Rabbia e Tarantella is in the soundtrack of Inglourious Basterds (2009) by Quentin Tarantino.
 Extensive use of tarantellas is made in the French film Tous les soleils (2011).

Television
 The Backyardigans episode "The Legend of the Volcano Sisters" features Tarantella as the music style du jour.

Stage
 It has appeared in the musical version of Peter Pan (1954 on stage) with Mary Martin, and is danced by Captain Hook and his band of pirates, illustrating the above-mentioned occasional association with sword fights vis à vis the metaphor of pirates.  In this performance, which is available on film, television, and DVD, the context is silly fun.
 In the song "How I Saved Roosevelt" from Assassins, a tarantella is used to musically represent Giuseppe Zangara.

Video games
 A tarantella is part of the soundtrack for game Assassin's Creed II (2009)
 The "Puppy Love" level of Earthworm Jim 2 uses both Tarantella Napoletana and Funiculì, Funiculà as music.

Literature
 Hilaire Belloc's poem "Tarantella" (1929) mimics in words the progress of the dance, culminating in the stillness of death. Online versions of the poem vary: a reliable printed version can be found in The Oxford Book of Modern Verse.
 In Henrik Ibsen's play A Doll's House, a performance of the tarantella is central to the plot.
 Edgar Allan Poe's short story "The Gold-Bug" (1843) features the introductory lines, "What ho!  What ho!  This fellow is dancing mad.  He has been bitten by the tarantella", which Poe ascribes to a 1761 play by Arthur Murphy, although the lines do not appear in the play.
 Tim Powers' novel Medusa's Web (2015) uses the 18/8 version of the tarantella and its effect on (supernatural) spiders as a plot device.
 In Susan Sontag's novel The Volcano Lover: A Romance (1992), Lady Emma Hamilton shocks her company by dancing a tarantella.
 In Carolina De Robertis' novel The Gods of Tango (2015), the crowd at the port of Naples sings a tarantella to send off the new emigrants to Buenos Aires.

Comics
 In Axis Powers Hetalia, Southern Italy/Romano cures his disease by dancing the tarantella with Spain; one of the songs sung by him, "The Delicious Tomato Song", is a tarantella.

References

Music-related lists
Classical music lists
Film music
Music in fiction
Dance forms in classical music
Sacred dance
Italian folk dances
17th-century music genres
Taranto